Stephen Heys (1879 – after 1909) was an English professional footballer who played as a defender. Born in Accrington, Lancashire, he played non-league football with Colne before joining Football League Second Division side Burnley in May 1906. He made his Football League debut on 12 October 1907 in the 0–1 loss to Fulham at Turf Moor. Heys failed to make another first-team appearance for Burnley and transferred to Haslingden in May 1909.

References

1879 births
Year of death missing
People from Accrington
English footballers
Association football defenders
Colne F.C. players
Burnley F.C. players
Haslingden F.C. players
English Football League players